"Perfect Storm" is the twenty-fourth episode and the season finale of the ninth season of the American television medical drama Grey's Anatomy, and is the 196th episode overall. It aired on May 16, 2013 on ABC in the United States. The episode was written by Stacy McKee and directed by Rob Corn. On its initial airing, it was watched by 8.99 million viewers. The episode received widespread critical acclaim upon telecast.

In the episode, Grey-Sloan Memorial Hospital experienced power outages and a bus crash during an intense superstorm. The episode was loosely based on Hurricane Sandy, which hit the East Coast in 2012. A bus crashes in front of the hospital in the midst of the storm, and the doctors try to rescue the survivors.

Plot
The hospital continues to operate despite the power outage. Meredith requires a C-section, which is performed in the dark, the baby is born healthy, but her earlier fall causes serious abdominal bleeding. Bailey scrubs in to save Meredith, but before she picks up a scalpel she puts on two pairs of gloves. While Meredith is in surgery, Cristina and Derek have a heart-to-heart. Arizona, Alex and Jo must deal with chaos when oxygen machines in the NICU stop working. Cristina operates on Richard's patient by listening to his heart in the dark. The ER staff rush to help the passengers of a burning bus.

Callie, April and Bailey load patients into the hospital as Owen and Avery struggle to get a woman out who’s pleading with them to find her young daughter. After they emerge from the bus, Avery looks back and sees a little girl’s shoe on the ground. Avery finds the little girl hiding inside the bus which explodes and he later emerges from the flames with the little girl in his arms. April questions her engagement to Matthew when she believes that Jackson has died in the bus explosion.

Alex tells Jo he loves her, she reciprocates, and they begin a relationship. Callie finds out about Arizona's encounter with Dr. Boswell  and they have a standoff which unleashes their unfiltered feelings. Cristina breaks up with Owen. Bailey is searching the hospital looking for Richard. Bailey tells Ben that she wants to apologize to Richard for hurting him and calling him a drunk. Then we see Richard face down in a puddle in the hospital electrical room, having been electrocuted.

Reception

Broadcast
The episode was originally broadcast on May 16, 2013 in the United States on the American Broadcasting Company (ABC), and it was watched by 8.99 million viewers. In the key 18-49 demographic, the episode was ranked #11 and #18 in overall viewership rank and was the #4 most-watched drama. The episode scored a 3.1/8 in Nielsen ratings and was the #3 most-watched drama.

Reviews

The episode received widespread critical acclaim upon telecast.

Entertainment Weekly gave a positive review writing, "I’m freaking out! I spent the entire episode predicting which character was going to end the season in peril, and let’s just say that the nature of the episode caused me to change my mind at least 4 times."

TV Fanatic lauded the episode and said, "No matter what goes on during a season, Grey's Anatomy is always able to pull off an unforgettable finale and 'Perfect Storm' was no exception. From explosions to operating in the dark, to the arrival of a beautiful McBabyBoy and the realization of a plethora of feelings by many of the doctors, the hour was jam-packed." and praised the cast, "Big kudos to Ellen Pompeo and Chandra Wilson for amazing performances."

The Hollywood Reporter said the episode was "emotional on multiple levels"  whereas AfterEllen called it "was a hot mess of emotions".

Examiner.com reviewing the season finale wrote, "Grey's Anatomy delivered yet another epic and emotional season finale that pushes our characters in challenging new directions." The site added, "'Perfect Storm' gets 5 out of 5 stars. This storm brought on all kinds of emotional strife and death that truly tests the seasoned doctors and pushes them to their element. They bond together, guiding each other through the dark and as the dust settles from this mayhem, there are casualties of all kinds. The tragedy that leaves us hanging until next fall is one hell of a thrill ride full to the brim with shocks."

References

Grey's Anatomy (season 9) episodes
2013 American television episodes